See the Light is the debut full-length album from New York synth-pop group Jessica 6, headed by singer Nomi Ruiz.

Track listing

References

2011 debut albums
Jessica 6 (band) albums
Peacefrog Records albums